Pierpaolo Barbieri (born 17 May 1987) is an Argentine economic historian, researcher, Executive Director at Greenmantle and founder of Ualá, an Argentina-based personal financial management mobile app. He is the author of the book Hitler’s Shadow Empire: The Nazis and the Spanish Civil War.

Academic and Professional Career
Pierpaolo Barbieri grew up in Buenos Aires, Argentina. His father is from Calabria and his mother is Argentine. He studied at Harvard University, publishing for his honors thesis the book Hitler's Shadow Empire: The Nazis and the Spanish Civil War, on the economic ties between Adolf Hitler's Germany and Francisco Franco's Spain, which was awarded the Thomas T. Hoopes '14 Prize. The research was conducted with the support of the Weatherhead Center for International Affairs, the Minda de Gunzburg Center for European Studies and the Real Colegio Complutense.

Upon graduation, he studied at Cambridge, where he was awarded a DPhil in economic history. Between 2011 and 2013, he was researcher and became Ernest May Fellow at the Harvard Kennedy School and Strategic Advisor at the Institute for New Economic Thinking (INET). He was also special advisor to the Berggruen Council on the Future of Europe.

As an economic analyst, he has published articles in newspapers and magazines such as the Spanish newspaper El País.

He is Executive Director at Greenmantle, a macroeconomic and geopolitical consulting firm, and was head strategist of the Brevan Howard Argentina Fund.

Ualá
In 2017, Barbieri founded Ualá, an Argentina-based personal financial management mobile app that allows users to conduct transactions, such as money transfers, payments and purchases, without having a bank account.

Ualá has initiated efforts to expand into the Mexican market, by the way of a not yet finalized acquisition of a Mexican Bank ABC Capital; the acquisition is pending regulatory approvals from Mexican banking and financial authorities. Ualá has been the subject of complaints from users who allege they were victims of financial scams via the app. Barbieri has contested the claims.

References

External links
 Ualá website

1987 births
Living people
Argentine businesspeople
Argentine people of Calabrian descent
People from Buenos Aires
Harvard Kennedy School alumni
Economic historians